Belgium competed at the 1968 Summer Olympics in Mexico City, Mexico. 82 competitors, 77 men and 5 women, took part in 55 events in 13 sports.

Medalists

Athletics

Canoeing

Cycling

Fifteen cyclists represented Belgium in 1968.

Individual road race
 Jean-Pierre Monseré
 Roger De Vlaeminck
 André Dierickx
 Jozef Schoeters

Team time trial
 Michel Coulon
 Frans Mintjens
 Marcel Grifnée
 Englebert Opdebeeck

Sprint
 Robert Van Lancker
 Daniel Goens

1000m time trial
 Dirk Baert

Tandem
 Daniel Goens
 Robert Van Lancker

Individual pursuit
 Paul Crapez

Team pursuit
 Ernest Bens
 Ronny Vanmarcke
 Willy Debosscher
 Paul Crapez

Fencing

Three fencers, all men, represented Belgium in 1968.

Men's foil
 Michel Constandt
 Florent Bessemans

Men's épée
 Michel Constandt
 Florent Bessemans

Men's sabre
 Yves Brasseur

Gymnastics

Hockey

Rowing

Sailing

Jacques Rogge

Shooting

Three shooters, all men, represented Belgium in 1968.

50 m rifle, three positions
 Frans Lafortune

50 m rifle, prone
 Frans Lafortune

Trap
 Guy Rénard

Skeet
 Francis Cornet

Swimming

Volleyball

Men's Team Competition
Round Robin
 Defeated Brazil (3-1) 
 Lost to Bulgaria (0-3) 
 Lost to Poland (0-3) 
 Lost to East Germany (0-3) 
 Lost to Japan (0-3) 
 Defeated Mexico (3-2) 
 Lost to Czechoslovakia (0-3) 
 Lost to Soviet Union (0-3) 
 Lost to United States (0-3) → 8th place
Team Roster

Weightlifting

Wrestling

References

External links
Official Olympic Reports
International Olympic Committee results database

Nations at the 1968 Summer Olympics
1968
Olympics